Maniaki is a village in the municipality Pylos–Nestoras, Messenia, Greece. It was the place where the Battle of Maniaki occurred on 1 June 1825.

Populated places in Messenia
Peloponnese in the Greek War of Independence